Vikartovce is a village and large municipality in Poprad District in the Prešov Region of northern Slovakia.

History
In historical records the village was first mentioned in 1283.

Geography
The municipality lies at an altitude of 756 metres and covers an area of 50.155 km². It has a population of about 1805 people.

Economy and infrastructure
In the village is football club. In 2010 Vikartovce had been a place for Slovakia Furman Championship /Majstrovstvá Slovenska furmanov/.

References

External links
http://vikartovce.e-obce.sk

fix indexing